Holy Rosary Parish is designated for Polish immigrants in Hadley, Massachusetts, United States.

Founded in 1916, it is one of the Polish-American Roman Catholic parishes in New England in the Diocese of Springfield in Massachusetts.

In 1998, Holy Rosary Parish and St. John Parish were merged, to become Most Holy Redeemer Parish.

Bibliography 
 
 
 The Official Catholic Directory in USA

External links 
  Holy Rosary - Diocesan information
 Holy Rosary - ParishesOnline.com
 Diocese of Springfield in Massachusetts

Roman Catholic parishes of Diocese of Springfield in Massachusetts
Polish-American Roman Catholic parishes in Massachusetts
Hadley, Massachusetts